Karimnagar Lok Sabha constituency  is one of the 17 Lok Sabha (Lower House of the Parliament) constituencies in Telangana state in southern India.

Bandi Sanjay Kumar of Bharatiya Janata Party is currently representing the constituency.

History
Since its inception in 1952 Karimnagar seat is a Congress stronghold, various political outfits like the Telangana Praja Samithi, Bharatiya Janata Party and the Telugu Desam Party have won it during different general elections.

After the formation of Telangana Rashtra Samithi the seat has been won by Kalvakuntla Chandrashekar Rao, the founder of TRS during the Telangana Agitation he won thrice from the constituency with huge margin.

Assembly segments
Karimnagar Lok Sabha constituency presently comprises the following Legislative Assembly segments:

Members of Parliament

Election results

General Election, 2019

General Election, 2014

General Election, 2009

General Election, 2004

Trivia
 C. Vidyasagar Rao, former Governor of Maharashtra represented the constituency in 12th Lok Sabha and 13th Lok Sabha respectively.
 K. Chandrashekar Rao, first Chief Minister of Telangana represented the constituency in 14th Lok Sabha .

See also
 Karimnagar district
 List of Constituencies of the Lok Sabha

References

External links
 Karimnagar lok sabha  constituency election 2019 date and schedule

Lok Sabha constituencies in Telangana
Karimnagar district